Lorenzo Bianchini (born January 17, 1989) is an Italian professional football player who currently plays for A.C. Isola Liri.

External links
 

1989 births
Living people
Italian footballers
U.S. Pistoiese 1921 players
Association football forwards